Pavel Andreyevich Gorbunov (born 13 May 1998) is a Russian football player.

Club career
He made his debut in the Russian Football National League for FC Akron Tolyatti on 8 August 2020 in a game against FC Shinnik Yaroslavl, he substituted Maksim Yeleyev in the 78th minute.

References

External links
 
 Profile by Russian Football National League
 

1998 births
Sportspeople from Tolyatti
Living people
Russian footballers
Association football defenders
FC Lada-Tolyatti players
FC Akron Tolyatti players